The IOC Refugee Olympic Team competed at the 2020 Summer Olympics in Tokyo, Japan, as independent Olympic participants.

This was the second appearance of a refugee team in the summer Olympics, following the 2016 Games.

For the 2020 Games, the team included 29 athletes, up from 10 in the 2016 team. The team comprised athletes originating from 11 nations who currently reside and train across 13 host nations, supported by the IOC's Olympic Scholarships for Refugee Athletes program.

At the parade of nations, the IOC Team, according to the Japanese script traditional order and English pronunciation  of IOC in Japanese, was the second to parade after Greece who traditionally parade first.

Team selection
The team was selected on 8 June 2021, represented in the following list, together with each competitor's country of origin and their host National Olympic Committee (NOC).

Competitors
The following is the list of number of competitors in the Games.

Athletics

Track & road events
Men

Women

Badminton

Refugee Olympic Team entered one male player to compete at the Games. Aram Mahmoud will competing in the men's singles event after received invitational by the IOC.

Boxing

Canoeing

Sprint

Cycling

Road

Judo

Mixed

Karate

Kumite

Kata

Shooting

Swimming

Taekwondo

Weightlifting

Wrestling

Greco-Roman

See also
 Refugee Olympic Team at the 2016 Summer Olympics
 Refugee Paralympic Team at the 2020 Summer Paralympics

References

 
Nations at the 2020 Summer Olympics
2020, Refugee
Olympic Athletes, 2020